Sajan Ghar Jaana Hai (Hindi: सजन घर जाना है) is an Indian television series that aired on STAR Plus. The series premiered on 5 August 2009 and ended on 25 June 2010. It was produced by directors Sumeet Hukamchand Mittal and Shashi Mittal. It was replaced by Rajan Shahi 's Chand Chupa Badal Mein.

Plot

Sajan Ghar Jana Hai revolves around the story of a simple and beautiful girl named Dhaani, the only daughter of Sudha Devi - a widow. Dhaani lives with her widowed mother and makes bridal dolls as a profession. Ambar, who was adopted by Badri Narayan Raghuvanshi, meets Dhaani accidentally and falls in love with her at first sight.

Eventually, Ambar and Dhaani get married with the blessing of their elders. But at the time of bidaai, after learning that her mother belongs to a lower caste, Dhaani's father-in-law refuses to accept her into his family. Unfortunately, Dhaani sacrifices her love and Amber and Sarla are married due to Dhaani's threatening to Amber of killing herself.

Soon, on Ambika's condition, Dhaani is forced to move into the Raghuvanshi house as Sakhi, the maid, in order to save Sarla. Slowly, Sarla and Dhaani begin sharing a healthy bond of friendship. Dhaani helps the immature Sarla to become a better daughter-in-law in the Raghuvanshi household. Dhaani continues to live as a maid for a while, but is happy with Ambandr and Sarla’s company. Finally, how Amber and Dhaani reunite despite many troubles forms the crux of the story.

Cast

Main
 Kunal Bhatia as Ambar Raghuvanshi: Badri's adoptive son; Dhaani's husband
 Neha Saxena/Barkha Sengupta as Dhaani Ambar Raghuvanshi / Sakhi: Ambar's first wife
 Zalak Desai as Sarla Ambar Raghuvanshi : Amber's second wife; Avinash's sister

Recurring
 Kunwar Aziz as Badri Narayan Raghuvanshi - Adoptive father of Ambar
 Gunn Kansara as Sudha Devi: Dhaani's mother
 Kalyani Trivedi/Neelima Panjrekar as Bhagwati Raghuvanshi: Amber's aunt
 Kunwar Aziz
 Damini Joshi as Kamli
 Khushi Sharma as Chunri
 Abigail Jain as Madhu
 Avantika Shetty as Gauri Sumer Raghuvanshi
 Leena Prabhu as Uma Badri Narayan Raghuvanshi
 Vidya Sinha as Bui: a senior maidservant of the Raghuvanshis
 Rakesh Mohar as Sumer Raghuvanshi
 Varun Khandelwal as Ambika Bhavani: Robin Hood-like bandit
 Jasveer Kaur as Roop: a woman who loves Ambika Bhavani
 Sunila Karambelkar as Shakuntala- scheming relative of the Raghuvanshis
 Nigaar Khan as Mohini - Daughter-in-law of Shakuntala
 Bharat as Chandu - Shakuntala's son

Production
The series was filmed at Film City, Mumbai. Barkha Sengupta replaced Nexa Saxena as Dhaani in March 2010.

Reception
The Indian Express stated the show as an average one reviewing, "Sajan Ghar Jana Hai, though has a fresh cast, yet it fails when it comes to weaving an engrossing tale. At times, the goings-on in the show are not engrossing. Also, what mars the show is its slow pace. Some fine editing should do the trick! Kunal Bhatia performs in a restrained manner. Neha Saxena despite having a pretty screen presence fails to look believable in her role."

References

External links
Sajan Ghar Jaana Hai Official Site on STAR Plus
Sajan Ghar Jaana Hai on IMDb

StarPlus original programming
Indian drama television series
Indian television series
2009 Indian television series debuts
2010 Indian television series endings
Shashi Sumeet Productions series